Vidāthu Sirippu (, a name parody on Vidāthu Karuppu (Tamil: விடாது கருப்பு) is a 2003 Tamil-language family soap opera, starring Maadhu Balaji, Cheenu Mohan, Crazy Mohan, Uma Ravi, Kathadi Ramamurthy, Sowbarnika, Neelu and Vinodhini that premiered on Jaya TV 20 December 2003. The series airs Saturday and Sunday at 9:00PM IST. It is directed by S.B. Khanthan.

Cast
 Maadhu Balaji
 Cheenu Mohan
 Crazy Mohan
 Uma Ravi
 Kathadi Ramamurthy
 Sowbarnika
 Vinodhini
 Neelu
 Chaams

References

External links
official website
Jaya TV on Youtube

Jaya TV television series
Tamil-language comedy television series
2003 Tamil-language television series debuts
2003 Tamil-language television series endings
2016 Tamil-language television series debuts
Tamil-language television shows